Pádraig Conneely is an Irish Fine Gael party politician. He was Mayor of Galway from 2008 to 2009, where he was known as "the maverick mayor".

Biography
Conneely was elected to Galway Corporation in 2002 and proved a divisive figure, frequently at the centre of contentious and personal attacks on city officials, that caused council meetings to be prolonged for hours or end in impasse. His reputation led to his being dubbed the maverick mayor upon his election in 2008.

While Mayor, he oversaw the city's successful hosting of the 2009 Volvo Ocean Race, which boosted revenue for the city despite the economic downturn. He was succeeded as mayor by Declan McDonnell.

References

External links
 Mayors of Galway

Mayors of Galway
Year of birth missing (living people)
Living people
Fine Gael politicians
Local councillors in Galway (city)
Politicians from County Galway